Franklin Latimore (born Franklin Latimore Kline, September 28, 1925 – November 29, 1998) was an American actor.

Life and career 
Latimore was born in Darien, Connecticut. He came from a well-to-do family, and was able to trace his lineage back to the American Revolutionary War. He ran away from home at an early age, and shortly thereafter got the lead part in a Broadway play.  He began his acting career in the 1930s, when he and longtime friend Lloyd Bridges performed in summer stock theater at a playhouse in Weston, Vermont.

Latimore then went to Hollywood where he signed a contract with 20th Century-Fox, and proceeded to appear in such hits as In the Meantime, Darling, The Dolly Sisters, Three Little Girls in Blue, and Shock.

After his years at Fox, he made films in Europe, most of which were swashbucklers such as Balboa, Conquistador of the Pacific, The Golden Falcon, Devil's Cavaliers, and many others, including two Zorro films and some westerns.  These were starring roles, much bigger than his Hollywood roles, to the effect that he became the darling of the swashbucklers during the late 50s and early 60s.  He appeared in the French film Purple Noon, as well as in the Italian melodrama A Woman Has Killed (1952).

Latimore appeared in two soap operas, playing Dr. Ed Coleridge on Ryan's Hope from 1975 to 1976, and Dr. Emmet Scott on Guiding Light from 1976 to 1979.  He did some work for PBS, most notably appearing in a film about the Civil War.

He married Rukmini Sukarno, an opera singer who was a daughter of President Sukarno of Indonesia. Their son, Chris Kline, is a journalist.

On November 29, 1998, he died in his sleep, at the age of 73.  His remains were cremated and buried beneath a venerable old apple tree on ancestral property in Vermont.

Selected filmography 
 In the Meantime, Darling (1944) – Lt. Daniel Ferguson
 The Dolly Sisters (1945) – Irving Netcher
 13 Rue Madeleine (1946) – Jeff Lassiter
 Shock (1946) – Lt. Paul Stewart
 Three Little Girls in Blue (1946) – Steve Harrington
 The Razor's Edge (1946) – Bob MacDonald
 Black Magic (1949) – Gilbert de Rezel
 Yvonne of the Night (1949) – Il tenente Carlo Rutelli
 Il caimano del Piave (1951) – Franco
 The Ungrateful Heart (1951) – Enrico De Marchi
 A Woman Has Killed (1952) – Capt. Roy Prescott
 At Sword's Edge (1952) – Don Ruy
 Three Forbidden Stories (1952) – Walter (Third segment)
 The Enemy (1952) – Roberto
 Sul ponte dei sospiri (1953) – Capitan Vessillo
 Neapolitans in Milan (1953) – Parenti
 Captain Phantom (1953) – Miguel, Duke of Canabil
 For You I Have Sinned (1953) – Reder
 Vestire gli ignudi (1954) – Franco Laspiga
 Papà Pacifico (1954) – Carlo Torquati
 Mata Hari's Daughter (1954) – Douglas Kent
 The Prince with the Red Mask (1955) – Masuccio, il principe dalla maschera rossa
 L'ultimo amante (1955) – Giorgio
 Il falco d'oro (1955) – Simone
 Lo spadaccino misterioso (1956) – Riccardo Degli Argentari
 Terrore sulla città (1957)
 Historias de la feria (1958) – Alfredo
 Cuatro en la frontera (1958) – Javier
 Secretaria para todo (1958) – Carlos García van Waguen
 Conspiracy of the Borgias (1959) – Guido di Belmonte
 John Paul Jones (1959) – Lt. Richard Dale
 Devil's Cavaliers (1959) – Capt. Richard Stiller
 Purple Noon (1960) – O'Brien
 Seven in the Sun (1960) – Frank
 Les Scélérats (1960) – Ted
 The Gallant Hours (1960) – Halsey's Aide (uncredited)
 Then There Were Three (1961) – Lt. Willotsky
 Capitaine tempête (1961)
 Rosa de Lima (1961) – Don Gil de Cepeda
 Zorro the Avenger (1962) – Don José de la Torre – El Zorro
 Shades of Zorro (1962) – Don José de la Torre – El Zorro
 The Shortest Day (1963) – Un soldato siciliano (uncredited)
 Los Conquistadores Del Pacífico (1963) – Vasco Núñez de Balboa
 Juego de hombres (1963)
 Apache Fury (1964) – Mayor Steve Loman
 Cavalry Charge (1964) – Corporal Paul White
 Hotel der toten Gäste (1965) – Larry Cornell
 Los cuatreros (1965) – Ladd
 Cast a Giant Shadow (1966) – 1st U.N. Officer
 The Honey Pot (1967) – Revenue Agent (scenes deleted)
 The Sergeant (1968) – Capt. Loring
 If It's Tuesday, This Must Be Belgium (1969) – George (uncredited)
 Patton (1970) – Lt. Col. Henry Davenport
 Rosolino Paternò, soldato... (1970) – American Lieutenant
 Mafia Connection (1970) – The American
 Le foto proibite di una signora per bene (1970) – Peter (English version, voice, uncredited)
 Confessions of a Police Captain (1971) – Traini (English version, voice, uncredited)
 The Designated Victim (1971) – Stefano (English version, voice, uncredited)
 A Bay of Blood (1971) – Frank (English version, voice, uncredited)
 Hector the Mighty (1972) – Hector (English version, voice, uncredited)
 Una mujer prohibida (1974) – Jaime
 The Girl in Room 2A (1974) – Johnson
 La encadenada (1975) – Alexander (English version, voice, uncredited)
 All the President's Men (1976) – Judge

References

External links 
 

1925 births
1998 deaths
American male television actors
People from Darien, Connecticut
20th Century Studios contract players
20th-century American male actors